Search and rescue is the search for and provision of aid to people who are in distress or imminent danger.

Television 
 Search and Rescue (1977 TV series), a Canadian-American television series
 "Search and Rescue!", a 1989 episode of The Raccoons
 Search and Rescue (Australian TV series), a 2008 Australian documentary series
 "Search and Rescue" (Stargate Atlantis), a 2008 episode of Stargate Atlantis

Music 
 Search/Rescue, progressive rock band

See also
 Search and rescue dog, a dog trained for search and rescue operations
 Search and rescue horse, a  horse used as transportation of mounted searchers and rescuers
 Search and Rescue Optimal Planning System, a comprehensive search and rescue system
 RAF Search and Rescue Force, an RAF organisation providing round-the-clock search and rescue operations in the UK, Cyprus and the Falkland Islands